Everett W. Anderson (July 12, 1839 - February 4, 1917) was an American soldier who received the Medal of Honor for valor during the American Civil War.

Biography
Anderson served in the American Civil War in Company M, 15th Pennsylvania Cavalry for the Union Army. He received the Medal of Honor on December 3, 1894.  He is the grandson of Isaac Anderson (congressman).

Medal of Honor citation
Citation:

Captured, single-handed, Confederate Brig. Gen. Robert B. Vance during a charge upon the enemy.

See also

List of American Civil War Medal of Honor recipients: A–F

References

External links

Congressional Medal of Honor Society

1839 births
1917 deaths
Union Army soldiers
United States Army Medal of Honor recipients
People of Pennsylvania in the American Civil War
American Civil War recipients of the Medal of Honor